Stefan Waggershausen (born 20 February 1949) is a German singer, composer, and songwriter.

Waggershausen was born in Friedrichshafen, at Lake Constance. In 1974 he produced his first record as singer. In 1980, he had his first big success with the song Hallo Engel. Further songs were released, partly sung together with Ofra Haza and María Conchita Alonso. The biggest commercial success of Waggershausen's career were the 1984 duet "Zu Nah Am Feuer" with Italian singer-songwriter Alice and the 1990 duet Das erste Mal tat's noch weh with Viktor Lazlo.

Discography 
 Traumtanzzeit (1974)
  Hallo Engel (1980)
  Fang mich auf (1981)
  Sanfter Rebell (1982)
  Tabu (1984)
 Mitten ins Herz (1984, Live)
  Touché d'amour (1985)
  Im Herzen des Orkans (1987)
  Tief im Süden meines Herzens (1990)
 Herzsprünge (1991)
  Wenn dich die Mondfrau küßt (1993)
  Louisiana (1995)
  Die Rechnung kommt immer (1997)
  Wolke 7 (2000)
 Duette & Balladen (2003)
 Unterm Cajun-Mond (2004)
 So ist das Spiel (2010)
 Aus der Zeit gefallen (2019)

External links 
Official website 

1949 births
Living people
People from Friedrichshafen
Schlager musicians
German singer-songwriters